The 2012 Dartmouth Big Green football team represented Dartmouth College in the 2012 NCAA Division I FCS football season. The Big Green were led by head coach Buddy Teevens in his eighth straight year and 13th overall and played their home games at Memorial Field. They are a member of the Ivy League. They finished the season 6–4 overall and 4–3 in Ivy League play to place in a three-way tie for third. Dartmouth averaged 6,402 fans per game.

Schedule

References

Dartmouth
Dartmouth Big Green football seasons
Dartmouth Big Green football